

Sir Samuel Luke Fildes  (3 October 1843  – 28 February 1927) was a British painter and illustrator born in Liverpool and trained at the South Kensington and Royal Academy Schools. He was the grandson of the political activist Mary Fildes.

Illustrator

At the age of 17, Fildes became a student at the Warrington School of Art. Fildes moved to the South Kensington Art School where he met Hubert von Herkomer and Frank Holl. All three men became influenced by the work of Frederick Walker, the leader of the social realist movement in Britain.

Fildes shared his grandmother's concern for the poor and in 1869 joined the staff of The Graphic newspaper, an illustrated weekly began and edited by the social reformer, William Luson Thomas. Fildes shared Thomas' belief in the power of visual images to change public opinion on subjects such as poverty and injustice. Thomas hoped that the images in The Graphic would result in individual acts of charity and collective social action.

Fildes' illustrations were in the black-and-white style popular in France and Germany during the era. He worked in a social realist style, compatible with the editorial direction of The Graphic, and focused on images depicting the destitute of London. The Graphic published an illustration completed by Fildes the day after Charles Dickens' death, showing Dickens' empty chair in his study; this illustration was widely reprinted worldwide, and inspired Vincent van Gogh's painting The Yellow Chair.

In the first edition of The Graphic newspaper that appeared in December 1869, Luke Fildes was asked to provide an illustration to accompany an article on the Houseless Poor Act, a new measure that allowed some of those people out of work to shelter for a night in the casual ward of a workhouse. The picture produced by Fildes showed a line of homeless people applying for tickets to stay overnight in the workhouse. The wood-engraving, entitled Houseless and Hungry, was seen by John Everett Millais, who brought it to the attention of Charles Dickens; Dickens was so impressed that he immediately commissioned Fildes to illustrate The Mystery of Edwin Drood (a book Dickens never finished as he died while writing it).

Fildes' illustrations also appeared in other mass-circulation periodicals: Sunday Magazine, The Cornhill Magazine, and The Gentleman's Magazine. He also illustrated a number of books in addition to Dickens' Edwin Drood, such as Thackeray's Catherine (1894).

Painter
Fildes soon became a popular artist and by 1870 he had given up working for The Graphic and had turned his full attention to oil painting. He took rank among the ablest English painters, with The Casual Ward (1874), The Widower (1876), The Village Wedding (1883), An Al-fresco Toilette (1889); and The Doctor (1891), now in Tate Britain. He also painted a number of pictures of Venetian life and many notable portraits, among them portraits commemorating the coronation of King Edward VII and Queen Alexandra. He was elected an Associate of the Royal Academy (A.S.A.) in 1879, and a Royal Academician (R.A.) in 1887; and was knighted by King Edward VII in 1906. In 1918, he was appointed as Knight Commander of the Royal Victorian Order (KCVO) by King George V. Fildes produced a large number of caricatures for Vanity Fair under the nom de crayon "ELF". He and Henry Woods were regarded as leaders of the Neo-Venetian school.

Personal life
In 1874 Luke Fildes married Fanny Woods, who was also an artist and the sister of Henry Woods.

Fildes' first son, Philip, died of typhoid in 1877.  The image of the doctor at his son's side during the ordeal left a lasting memory of professional devotion that inspired Fildes' 1891 work The Doctor. His later son, Sir Paul Fildes, was an eminent scientist. They also had another son, Geoffrey, and a daughter Phyllis.

A blue plaque marks Fildes's former house, Woodland House, in Melbury Road, Kensington, next to William Burges's Tower House. His home was later owned by film director Michael Winner.

Fildes died in 1927 and is buried in Brookwood Cemetery.

Modern politics

In 1949 Fildes' painting The Doctor (1891) was used by the American Medical Association in a campaign against a proposal for nationalised medical care put forth by President Harry S. Truman. The image was used in posters and brochures along with the slogan, "Keep Politics Out of this Picture" implying that involvement of the government in medical care would negatively affect the quality of care. 65,000 posters of The Doctor were displayed, which helped to raise public scepticism for the nationalised health care campaign.

Gallery
Works by Fildes

Related to Fildes

Notes

References

L. V. Fildes, Luke Fildes, R.A., A Victorian Painter (Michael Joseph, 1968)

External links

 
 
 
 
 Sir Luke Fildes
 New York Times 1880
 

1843 births
1927 deaths
Artists from Liverpool
Artists' Rifles soldiers
British genre painters
English illustrators
19th-century English painters
English male painters
20th-century English painters
Knights Bachelor
Knights Commander of the Royal Victorian Order
Royal Academicians
Vanity Fair (British magazine) artists
Social realist artists
20th-century English male artists
19th-century English male artists
Burials at Brookwood Cemetery